The Waste Management Licensing Regulations 1994 (S.I. 1994/1056) formerly applied in Great Britain (England, Scotland and Wales) to those persons involved in the collection, storage, treatment and disposal of controlled wastes. The regulations dictate the licensing of persons or businesses involved in the management of waste and relate directly to the licensing of a site or activity to carry out the management, processing and disposal of wastes.  (Note: The regulations were superseded in 2007 after the formation of the "permitting regulations".)  These activities were previously covered by provisions contained within the Control of Pollution Act 1974 (COPA). The regulations implement certain provisions of European Directive 91/156/EEC and are enacted under the Environmental Protection Act 1990.

A licence is required to authorise the:

Deposit of controlled waste to land
Disposal of waste by means of plant of equipment, which includes
Baling
Compacting
Incinerating
Pulverising
Sorting
Storing
Processing
Shredding
Composting
Treatment, keeping or disposal of controlled waste on land
Treatment, keeping or disposal of controlled waste by mobile plant
Treatment, keeping or disposal of controlled wastes in a manner likely to cause pollution to the environment or harm to human health

Licensing

On April 6, 2008, the Waste Management Licensing Regulations were replaced for England and Wales by the Environmental Permitting Regulations 2007.  There are no longer separate regulation regimes for waste management and PPC (Pollution Prevention Control) activities, with both being regulated by way of Environmental Permits.

In order to obtain a licence certain conditions must be met. These fall into 3 categories which are aimed to ensure that waste management is in the hands of "fit and proper persons".

Technical competence

This generally requires involvement of the Waste management training board WAMITAB.

 there is a requirement that managers of the facilities have obtained the relevant Certificate of Technical Competence (CoTC) in which there are a number of levels.

Relevant offences

That the company, or persons acting for the company, should not have any summary convictions relating to provisions of regulations affecting the industry. A licence can be subsequently revoked if a licence holder has ceased to be fit and proper by reason of his having been convicted of a relevant offence.

Financial Provision/Security

The applicant would not be regarded as fit and proper if it appears to the waste regulation authority (WRA) that:

He has not made financial provision adequate to discharge the obligations arising from the licence
he either has no intention of making it, or is in no position to make it

As the provision is based on licence conditions, which are variable depending upon the operation, financial provision will be variable. In the case of landfill operations these funds will also be expected to cover the post-closure period where continuing expenditure might be expected for: monitoring replacement of pollution control equipment, and site restoration.

Security (usually in the form of insurance) must also be provided to cover eventualities that would be likely to have higher costs than those planned for in the ordinary course of business, e.g. failure of a landfill containment causing pollution of water courses.

The issues of risk are discussed between all parties involved in the application, i.e. the applicant, WRA and the provider of the cover to decide:

What event would trigger payment
What specific works or other measures are to be covered
The amount of the appropriate cover

Ultimately the WRA needs to be satisfied that adequate cover for risks has been provided; to reinforce this it may be included as part of the licence condition.

Facility

Location/ Siting of Waste Management Facility

The location of the proposed waste management facility must be such that it is not located within 2 kilometers of a SSSI (Site of Special Scientific Interest).

Facility Provisions

Permitting (Licensing) requires that for certain installations (notably WEEE and Hazardous Waste treatment facilities), they are of such construction as to prevent the contamination of groundwater and the local environment.  The facility must be contained within a building, with impermeable floor (concrete) and no activities may be carried out outside of the demise of the treatment facility.

Planning

Planning applications have to be granted prior to the commencement of a waste management application being submitted.  This includes a "change of use" planning application.  Planning must be granted for the category "Waste" in order to comply with waste management licensing regulations.

Baseline Assessment

As part of the license application, a site layout has to be submitted, describing the various activities that are to be undertaken and the location that these activities will be carried out.  A baseline assessment of the site is also required, documenting current pollution levels.  This assessment defines the condition to which the site is to be returned, at the end of its useful working life,

For Scotland, the 1994 Regulations were replaced by the Waste Management Licensing (Scotland) Regulations 2011 (SSI 2011/228) with effect from 27 March 2011

See also
Waste legislation

References 

Waste legislation in the United Kingdom
Statutory Instruments of the United Kingdom
1994 in British law